Otto Torsten Johan Aust (25 July 1892 – 12 October 1943) was a Swedish sailor. He was a crew member of the boat Kerstin that won the bronze medal in the 6 m class at the 1912 Summer Olympics.

References

1892 births
1943 deaths
Swedish male sailors (sport)
Sailors at the 1912 Summer Olympics – 6 Metre
Olympic sailors of Sweden
Olympic bronze medalists for Sweden
Olympic medalists in sailing
Royal Gothenburg Yacht Club sailors

Medalists at the 1912 Summer Olympics
20th-century Swedish people